Newport Corporation may refer to:

Newport City Council, of which Newport Corporation was a forerunner
Newport Bus, also known as Newport Corporation Transport
Newport Corporation (company), a supplier of scientific equipment